NGC 6300 is a barred Seyfert spiral galaxy located in the constellation Ara. It is classified as SB(rs)b in the galaxy morphological classification scheme and was discovered by the Scottish astronomer James Dunlop on 30 June 1826. NGC 6300 is located at about 51 million light years away from Earth. It is suspected that a massive black hole (300,000 times the mass of Sun) may be at its center, pulling all the nearby objects into it. In turn, it emits large amounts of X-rays.

See also 
 List of NGC objects (6001–7000)
 List of NGC objects

References

External links 
 

Barred spiral galaxies
Seyfert galaxies
Ara (constellation)
6300